This article lists various statistics related to Alianza Futbol Clube.

All stats accurate as of 19 April 2015.

Honours
As of 19 April 2015, Alianza have won 10 Primera División titles, one UNCAF Club Championship and one CONCACAF Champions' Cup trophies.

Domestic competitions

League
Primera División
Winners (16): 1965–66, 1966–67, 1986–87, 1989–90, 1993–94, 1996–97, [[Primera División de Fútbol Profesional – Apertura 1998|Apertura 1998 [the 1998/99 Copa Pilsener title of Alianza was not an official championship; only since the 1999/00 season two champions are crowned annually], Apertura 2001, Clausura 2004, Clausura 2011, Apertura 2015, Apertura 2017, Clausura 2018, Apertura 2019, Apertura 2020, Apertura 2021

Cup
Copa Santa Ana
Winners (1): 1977

CONCACAF competitions

Official titles
CONCACAF Champions' Cup: 1 
 Winners (1): ::1967
UNCAF Club Championship: 1
 Winners (1): ::1997
Runner-up (1): 1980

Individual awards

Award winners
Top Goalscorer (8)
The following players have won the Goalscorer while playing for Alianza:
 Luis Ernesto Tapia (23)  – 1965-66
 Luis Ernesto Tapia (25)  – 1966-67
 Ruben Alonso (15)  – 1987-88
 Rodrigo Alfonso Osorio † (10)  – Apertura 1998
 Martín García (11)  – Clausura 2005
 Alex Amílcar Erazo (9)  – Apertura 2005
 Francisco Jovel Álvarez (11)  – Apertura 2007
 José Oliveira de Souza (11)  – 2010 Clausura
 Rodolfo Zelaya (9)  – Apertura 2010
 Rodolfo Zelaya (13)  – Clausura 2011
 Sean Fraser (12) – Apertura 2012

Goalscorers 
Most goals scored : TBD - TBD
Most League goals: TBD - 
Most League goals in a season: TBD - TBD, Primera Division, YEAR
Most goals scored by an Alianza player in a match: TBD - TBD v. TBD (TBD 7-2 TBD), DAY MONTH YEAR
Most goals scored by an Alianza player in an International match: TBD - TBD & TBD v. TBD, DAY MONTH YEAR
Most goals scored in CONCACAF competition: TBD - tbd, tbd

All-time top goalscorers 

<small>Note: Players in bold text are still active with Club Deportivo Alianza.</small>

Historical goals

 Players 

AppearancesCompetitive, professional matches only including substitution, number of appearances as a substitute appears in brackets.Last updated - 

Other appearances records
 Youngest first-team player:  –  TBD v TBD, Primera Division, Day Month Year
 Oldest post-Second World War player:  –  TBD v TBD, Primera Division, Day Month Year
 Most appearances in Primera Division: TBD –  TBD
 Most appearances in Copa Presidente: TBD –  TBD
 Most appearances in International competitions: TBD –  TBD
 Most appearances in CONCACAF competitions: TBD –  TBD
 Most appearances in UNCAF competitions: TBD  –  TBD
 Most appearances in CONCACAF Champions League: TBD –  TBD
 Most appearances in UNCAF Copa: TBD  TBD
 Most appearances in FIFA Club World Cup: 2

 Zózimo

 Most appearances as a foreign player in all competitions: TBD –  TBD
 Most appearances as a foreign player in Primera Division: TBD –  TBD
 Most consecutive League appearances: TBD –  TBD – from Month Day, Year at Month Day, Year
 Shortest appearance: –

Records

Scorelines
Record League victory: 7–0 vs.  C.D. Santa Clara, Clausura 1999, 18 April 1999  vs. Once Municipal (Clausura 2013)
Record League Defeat: TBD-TBD v  TBD, Primera division, Day Month Year
Record Cup victory: TBD–TBD v TBD, Presidente Cup, TBD
Record CONCACAF Champions League Victory: 8-0 v Flor de Caña FC, 6 August 1967
Record CONCACAF Champions League defeat: TBD–TBD v TBD, TBD, TBD
Record CONCACAF League Victory: 2-1 v Platense, 2 August 2017 and 8 August 2017
Record CONCACAF League defeat: 1-3 v Olimpia, 24 August 2017
Record UNCAF Victory: 7–2 v Panama Viejo, 19 February 2000
Record UNCAF defeat: 0-3 v Saprissa, 1970  Comunicaciones, 1976  Cartaginés 1976  Aurora, 1979  1-4 Olimpia, 1979

Sequences
Most wins in a row: TBD, TBD - TBD
Most home wins in a row (all competitions): TBD, TBD– TBD
Most home league wins in a row: TBD, TBD - TBD
Most away wins in a row: TBD, TBD – TBD
Most draws in a row: TBD, TBD
Most home draws in a row: TBD, TBD
Most away draws in a row: TBD, TBD
Most defeats in a row: 8, TBD
Most home defeats in a row: TBD, TBD
Most away defeats in a row: TBD, TBD
Longest unbeaten run: 42, 2017 Clausura (30 July 2017) - 2018 Apertura (28 March 2018)
Longest unbeaten run at home: TBD, TBD
Longest unbeaten run away: TBD, TBD
Longest winless run: TBD,  TBD – TBD
Longest winless run at home: TBD, TBD – TBD
Longest winless run away: TBD, TBD - TBD

Seasonal
Most goals in all competitions in a season: TBD - TBD
Most League goals in a season: 83 goals - 1965-66
Fewest league goals conceded in a season: 6 - 1981
Most points in a season: 50 points - 1965-1966 season
Most points in a season (Apertura/Clausura): TBD - , TBD
Most League wins in a season: TBD – TBD
Most League wins in a season (Apertura/Clausura): TBD – TBD
Most home League wins in a season: TBD – TBD
Most away League wins in a season: TBD – TBD

Internationals
Most international caps (total while at club): TBD - TBD - El Salvador

Attendances
Highest home attendance: TBD, TBD
Highest away attendance: TBD v TBD, TBD, TBD, TBD

Other
 Alianza was one of four teams (Aguila, Platense and Vista Hermosa to win a championship following promotion to Primera division.
 Alianza was the first Salvadoran team to win the CONCACAF Champions' Cup, which they achieved in 1967
 Alianza were the last Salvadoran team to win the UNCAF Interclub Cup, which they achieved in 1997.
 Alianza are the last Salvadoran team to win an international title, which was the UNCAF Interclub Cup in 1997

InternationalsThe following players represented their countries while playing for Alianza (the figure in brackets is the number of caps gained while an Alianza player. Many of these players also gained caps while at other clubs.) Figures for active players (in bold) last updated 2021  

Chile
 Luis Hernán Álvarez

Colombia
 Edgar Ramos

Costa Rica
 Pedro Cubillo 
 Eduardo Tanque Ramirez
 Claudio Jara
Johnny Woodly

Cuba
Yaikel Pérez

Dominican Republic
Jonathan Faña
Gabriel Ernesto Núñez

El Salvador
Arturo Albarran
Marcelo Messias
Washington de la Cruz

Gabon
 Didier Ovono

Guatemala
Edward Cocherari

Honduras
Ramón Maradiaga
Abel Rodríguez
Elvis Scott

Jamaica
Sean Fraser

Netherlands Antilles
Roland Albert Martell

Nicaragua
Armando Collado
Cyril Errington

Panama
Erick Ortega
Luis Ernesto Tapia
Francisco Portillo
Orlando Rodríguez
Anel Canales
Alberto Zapata
Nicolás Muñoz

Trinidad and Tobago
Willis Plaza

Uruguay
Julio César Cortés
Alejandro Curbelo
Yari Silvera

Record versus other clubs
 As of 2022-04-07''
The Concacaf opponents below = Official tournament results: 
(Plus a sampling of other results)

Historical Matches

References

External links

Football in El Salvador